A Night in Rio (Finnish: Rion yö) is a 1951 Finnish musical comedy film directed by Ville Salminen and starring Assi Nortia, Leif Wager and Tapio Rautavaara.

Cast
 Assi Nortia as Carmen Conchita  
 Leif Wager as Lefa  
 Tapio Rautavaara as Tapsa  
 Lasse Pöysti as Lasse  
 Ville Salminen as Don Jose  
 Rauni Luoma as Donna Lola  
 Reino Valkama as Mikko 
 Yrjö Ikonen as Miguel  
 Birger Kortman 
 Rakel Laakso 
 Matti Lehtelä 
 Veikko Linna as Chef  
 Otto Noro 
 Heikki Savolainen 
 Oke Tuuri as Pedro  
 Kauko Vuorensola
 Kaarlo Wilska as Police

References

Bibliography 
 Qvist, Per Olov & von Bagh, Peter. Guide to the Cinema of Sweden and Finland. Greenwood Publishing Group, 2000.

External links 
 

1951 films
1951 musical comedy films
Finnish musical comedy films
1950s Finnish-language films
Films directed by Ville Salminen
Finnish black-and-white films